Rob Duprey is an American rock guitarist, keyboardist and songwriter. Duprey first came to prominence as guitarist for the mid-1970s New York City underground pop band Mumps, led by Lance Loud and Kristian Hoffman. Later, he worked with Iggy Pop, playing guitar on Party (1981) and co-writing the bulk of Zombie Birdhouse.

He is currently a member of the Washington DC-area band, The Loggers, along with Stock Wilson (guitar, vocals), Vince Sanfuentes (bass), and Piers Hackley (drums).

Selected discography (as guitarist)
 Mumps, "Crocodile Tears" single. 1977. (Bomp! Records BEJ-1 ; reissued 2005, Sympathy For The Record Industry SFTRI 759)
 Mumps, "Rock & Roll This, Rock & Roll That" single. 1978. (Perfect Records PR-1)
 Gary Valentine, "The First One" single. 1978. (Beat Records Beat 001)
 Iggy Pop, Party LP. 1981. (Arista AL 9572)
 Iggy Pop, Zombie Birdhouse LP. 1982. (Animal Records APE 6000)
 Cosmetic with Jamaaladeen Tacuma, So Tranquilizin''' CD. 1985. (Gramavision 18-1210-1)
 Iggy Pop, Live CD. 1991. (Revenge Records ME 109 bis)
 Mumps, Fatal Charm: 1975-1980 -- A Brief History of a Brief History compilation CD. 1994. (Eggbert Records ER80011CD)
 Mumps, How I Saved The World'' compilation CD and DVD. 2005. (Sympathy for the Record Industry SFTRI 754)

References

External links
Punkturns30

American punk rock guitarists
American rock keyboardists
American male songwriters
Living people
American male guitarists
Year of birth missing (living people)